The men's team foil competition in fencing at the 2012 Olympic Games in London was held on 5 August at the ExCeL Exhibition Centre.

Twenty-eight fencers from nine countries competed.

Format
Great Britain, as hosts, were allowed to enter a team in any event they chose. They entered a team in this competition, and fenced against the 8th-seeded Egyptian team, with the winning team joining the seven other teams in the main quarter-final draw. Quarter-final losers continued fencing to determine ranking spots for fifth through eighth, while the quarter-final winners met in the semi-finals. The winners of the semi-final bouts competed for the gold medal, while the losing teams competed for the bronze.

Team events competed to a maximum of 45 touches.

Schedule 
All times are British Summer Time (UTC+1)

Draw

Finals

Classification 5–8

Final classification

References

Results 

Men's team foil
Men's events at the 2012 Summer Olympics